Vysokusha is a rural locality (a village) in Ust-Vayengskoye Rural Settlement of Vinogradovsky District, Arkhangelsk Oblast, Russia. The population was 10 as of 2010.

Geography 
Vysokusha is located 19 km north of Bereznik (the district's administrative centre) by road. Goltsovo is the nearest rural locality.

References 

Rural localities in Vinogradovsky District